IRS-1B, Indian Remote Sensing satellite-1B, the second of the series of indigenous state-of-art remote sensing satellites, was successfully launched into a polar Sun-synchronous orbit on 29 August 1991 from the Soviet Cosmodrome at Baikonur. It was a part-operational, part-experimental mission to develop Indian expertise in satellite imagery. It was a successor to the remote sensing mission IRS-1A, both undertaken by the Indian Space Research Organisation (ISRO).

History 
IRS-1B was the second remote sensing mission to provide imagery for various land-based applications, such as agriculture, forestry, geology, and hydrology.

Satellite description 
Improved features compared to its predecessor (IRS-1A): gyroscope referencing for better orientation sensing, time tagged commanding facility for more flexibility in camera operation and line count information for better data product generation.

The satellite was a box-shaped 1.56 m x 1.66 m x 1.10 metres bus with two Sun-tracking solar panels of 8.5 square metres each. Two nickel-cadmium batteries provided power during eclipses. The three-axis stabilised Sun-synchronous satellite had a 0.4° pitch/roll and 0.5° yaw pointing accuracy provided by a zero-momentum reaction wheel system utilising Earth/Sun/star sensors and gyroscopes.

Instruments 
IRS-1B carried two solid state push broom scanner Linear Imaging Self-Scanning Sensor (LISS):
 LISS-1 ( each band ground resolution)
 LlSS-2 ( each band ground resolution) 

The satellite carried two LISS push broom CCD sensors operating in four spectral bands compatible with Landsat Thematic Mapper and Spot HRV data. The bands were 0.45-0.52, 0.52-0.59, 0.62-0.68, and 0.77-0.86 microns. The LISS-2 imager bracketed the LISS-1 imager providing a  overlap. Data from the LISS-1 were downlinked on S-band at 5.2 Mbps and from the LISS-2 at 10.4 Mbps to the ground station at Shadnagar, India. The satellite was controlled from Bangalore, India.

Mission 
IRS-1B was operated in a Sun-synchronous orbit.

IRS-1B successfully completed its mission on 1 July 2001, after operating for 10 years.

See also 

 Indian Remote Sensing

References

External links 
 ISRO IRS-1B link

Earth observation satellites of India
Spacecraft launched in 1991
1991 in India
India–Soviet Union relations
1991 in the Soviet Union